Stora rubriker is a 1992 studio album from Swedish dansband Lotta & Anders Engbergs Orkester. It peaked at #33 at the Swedish album chart.

Track listing

Chart positions

References

1992 albums
Lotta & Anders Engbergs orkester albums